Scar is the eighth studio album by Joe Henry, released in May 2001 on Mammoth Records. Co-produced by Craig Street, it marked another shift in direction for Henry's music, and a foray into the genres of jazz and soul music. The opening track is a homage to comedian Richard Pryor (whom the album is also dedicated to), and according to Henry's essay "The Ghost in the Song," he was "called by a vision" to collaborate with free jazz artist Ornette Coleman. Henry wrote:

Henry eventually convinced Coleman to record a solo for the track "Richard Pryor Addresses a Tearful Nation," and also contributed a reprise at the very end of the album as a hidden track.  Henry discusses his interactions with Coleman at length as the last part of a 2016 interview.

Another track of note is "Stop", a tango written by Henry. His wife, Melanie, sent an early demo of the track to her sister Madonna, who re-used the lyrics for "Don't Tell Me". Henry often quips during live gigs that "I recorded my version as a tango, and she recorded hers as a hit".

Lizz Wright recorded a jazzy take on "Stop" which she included in her 2005 release Dreaming Wide Awake, also an album produced by Craig Street and recorded by S. Husky Höskulds.

Track listing 
All songs written by Joe Henry, except where noted.

 "Richard Pryor Addresses a Tearful Nation" – 6:21
 "Stop" – 4:40
 "Mean Flower" – 4:50
 "Struck" – 5:24
 "Rough and Tumble" – 4:53
 "Lock and Key" – 4:46
 "Nico Lost One Small Buddha" – 3:23
 "Cold Enough to Cross" – 3:12
 "Edgar Bergen" – 6:03
 "Scar" / hidden track: "Richard Pryor Reprise" (Henry, Ornette Coleman) – 14:22

Personnel 

 Joe Henry – vocals, guitar, keyboards, percussion
 Marc Ribot – guitar
 Bobby Malach – reeds
 David Piltch (as David Pilch) – bass
 Brian Blade – drums, percussion
 Ornette Coleman – alto saxophone solo
 Brad Mehldau – piano
 Meshell Ndegeocello – bass 
 Abe Laboriel Jr. – drums
 "Orchestra" on tracks 1, 4 and 9:
 Bobby Malach – reeds
 Sandra Park – violin, concertmaster
 Sharon Yamada – violin
 Robert Rinehart – viola
 Elizabeth Dyson, Gene Moye – cello
 Stacey Shames – harp
 Eric Charleston  – vibes, percussion
 Orchestra arranged and conducted by Steven Barber

References 

Joe Henry albums
2001 albums
Albums produced by Craig Street
Albums produced by Joe Henry